Lensky (masculine), Lenskaya (feminine), or Lenskoye (neuter) may refer to:

People with the surname
Aleksandr Pavlovich Lensky (1847-1908), Russian actor
Arno von Lenski (1893–1986), German general
Dmitry Lensky (1805–1860), nom de plume of D. Vorobyov, Russian comic actor
Gerhard Lenski (1924-2015),  American sociologist
Haim Lensky, Hebrew language poet
Irina Lenskiy (Lenskaya) (born 1971), Israeli athlete
Jacob Lensky (born 1988), Canadian soccer player
Lois Lenski (1893–1974), American children fiction writer
Richard C. H. Lenski (1864-1936), Lutheran scholar and author
Richard Lenski (born 1956), American evolutionary biologist
Simon Lenski, Belgian cello player of the DAAU band
Vladimir Lensky, a character in Eugene Onegin

Places
Lensky District, several districts in Russia
Lensky (rural locality) (Lenskaya, Lenskoye), several rural localities in Russia

See also
Lansky (disambiguation)